Cleveland Street is a busy thoroughfare near the central business district of Sydney in New South Wales, Australia. The street is named after Captain Cleveland, an officer of the 73rd regiment.

Traffic volumes vary, depending on the segment of Cleveland Street. Near Prince Alfred Park the average traffic movements in 2016 for both east and west-bound vehicles was 17,500. Further east, between South Dowling Street and Anzac Parade, 2016 average traffic volumes peaked at 20,000 vehicles west-bound.

Until 1958, electric trams ran down the length of Cleveland Street, when they were replaced by motor buses. The area between Crown and Bourke Streets is home to several pubs and an increasing number of restaurants. Cleveland Street Intensive English High School was located on the corner of Cleveland and Chalmers Streets.

Gallery

See also

References

Streets in Sydney
Surry Hills, New South Wales